Alcherio Martinoli is a roboticist and an associate professor at the École polytechnique fédérale de Lausanne (EPFL) in the School of Architecture, Civil and Environmental Engineering where he heads the Distributed Systems and Algorithms Laboratory.

Biography
Martinoli received his PhD degree in computer science in 1999 at the École polytechnique fédérale de Lausanne (EPFL) working under Jean-Daniel Nicoud. Martinoli did a post-doc with Rodney M. Goodman at Caltech, where he headed the Collective Robotics Group. In 2007, he joined EPFL as an SNSF Assistant Professor in School of Information and Communication. He has moved to School of Architecture, Civil and Environmental Engineering in 2008, where he is an associate professor.

He is the recipient of a Swiss National Science Foundation Young Investigator Award as well as the 2001 KiTi prize for young Swiss-Italian researchers who have distinguished themselves in the field of science, art, or humanities, as well as a "Best Paper Award" at the 2006 Conference on Distributed Autonomous Robotic Systems (DARS)

Work
Martinoli's research interests are in swarm robotics, swarm Intelligence, and self-organization with applications to transportation systems and large-scale networks of sensors and actuators. Martinoli is widely recognized for his work on distributed odor localization, modeling and designing swarm robotic systems, and mixed systems consisting of animals and robots, which has been cited more than 5000 times.

Martinoli and his laboratory have also taken a leading role in various open-source projects affecting the robotics community at large, most notably the software Swistrack, a multi-object tracking system for single and multi-camera
systems, the Khepera III Toolbox for the Khepera III robot, and the e-Puck mobile robot in collaboration with Francesco Mondada.

References

External links
 Distributed Systems and Algorithms Laboratory at EPFL

ETH Zurich alumni
École Polytechnique Fédérale de Lausanne alumni
Living people
Swiss roboticists
Academic staff of the École Polytechnique Fédérale de Lausanne
Year of birth missing (living people)